Brain Filter is a 1998 studio album released by the rave artist Ian Loveday, better known as Eon.

Track listing

References

1998 albums
Eon (musician) albums